Ironi Kiryat Ata is an Israeli professional basketball club based in Kiryat Ata, a city in the Haifa District of Israel, which currently competes in the Israeli Basketball Premier League. The team was founded in 1980, and was promoted to the top division in 2022. 

Their home arena is Ramaz Hall, with a capacity of 1,200 seats.

History
The team was founded in 1980. The club played in Ligat HaAl, the top division of Israeli basketball, having been promoted from Liga Leumit at the end of the 2007–08 season.

The team has had various names. It was named Elitzur Kiryat Ata/Motzkin (-2000), Ironi Kiryat Ata (2000-02), Elitzur Kiryat Ata (2002-03), Ironi Kiryat Ata (-2017), and has been named Elitzur Kiryat Ata since 2017.

The team was Israeli National League Champion in 2004 and 2022, and Israeli National League Regular Season Champion in 2015.  It was Israeli Artzit League Champion in 2011.

Current roster

Notable players

 Jimmy Hall (born 1994)
 Sir'Dominic Pointer
 Jerry Simon

References

External links
Club website

Basketball teams in Israel
Basketball teams established in 1980